G. Anderson may refer to:

 Galusha Anderson (1832–1918), American theologian
 Gary Anderson (motorsport) (born 1951), former Formula One racing car designer
 George Anderson (disambiguation), various people
 George Frederick Anderson (1793–1876), British musician and Master of the Queen's Music
 Geraint Anderson (born 1972), British analyst and columnist
 Gerald Anderson (born 1989), Filipino celebrity
 Gerry Anderson (1929–2012), British television producer and puppeteer
 Gillian Anderson (born 1968), American actress
 Glenn Anderson (born 1960), Canadian ice hockey player